The ninth season of Adventure Time, an American animated television series created by Pendleton Ward, premiered on the Cartoon Network on April 21, 2017 and concluded on July 21, 2017, and was produced by Frederator Studios and Cartoon Network Studios. The season follows the adventures of Finn (a human boy) and his best friend and adoptive brother, Jake, a dog with magical powers to change shape and size at will. Finn and Jake live in the post-apocalyptic Land of Ooo, where they interact with the other main characters of the show: Princess Bubblegum, The Ice King, Marceline the Vampire Queen, Lumpy Space Princess, BMO, and Flame Princess.

The season was storyboarded and written by Adam Muto, Sam Alden, Polly Guo, Seo Kim, Somvilay Xayaphone, Laura Knetzger, Steve Wolfhard, Tom Herpich, Graham Falk, Kent Osborne, Hanna K. Nyström, and Aleks Sennwald. During this season the miniseries Elements aired, which follows Finn, Jake, and BMO after they return home to discover that extreme elemental magic has turned Ooo into a dystopia. Finn and Jake join Ice King (voiced by Tom Kenny), Betty (voiced by Felicia Day), and Lumpy Space Princess (voiced by Pendleton Ward) to set things straight. The season also features guest animators Alex and Lindsay Small-Butera, who worked on "Ketchup".

It began with "Orb", which was watched by 0.71 million viewers (a decrease from the previous-season finale, "Islands Part 8: The Light Cloud", which was seen by one million viewers). The ninth-season finale, "Three Buckets", was watched by 0.85 million (the lowest-rated Adventure Time season finale at the time). Critical reception of the season was mainly positive, with the episodes making up Elements largely well-received. For her work on the episode "Ketchup", Lindsay Small-Butera won an Emmy Award for Outstanding Individual Achievement in Animation at the 70th Primetime Emmy Awards. A set containing the entire season was released on September 4, 2018.

Development

Concept

The series follows the adventures of Finn the Human (a boy) and his best friend, Jake, a dog with magical powers to change shape, grow, and shrink at will. Finn and Jake live in the post-apocalyptic Land of Ooo, where they interact with the other major characters: Princess Bubblegum, the Ice King, Marceline the Vampire Queen, Lumpy Space Princess, BMO, and Flame Princess. Common storylines revolve around Finn and Jake discovering strange creatures, dealing with the antagonistic-but-misunderstood Ice King, and battling monsters to help others. Multi-episode story arcs for this season include Finn and Jake undoing extreme elemental magic which had transformed Ooo into a dystopia while they were away at sea, and Fern (Finn's grass-based doppelgänger) struggling with his identity and eventually succumbing to evil impulses.

Production

This season's episodes were originally ordered as part of the series' eighth season. With the release of the seventh season DVD, Cartoon Network began re-arranging the season divisions; the seventh season now consisted of "Bonnie & Neddy" through "The Thin Yellow Line". "Broke His Crown" through "Reboot" (which had originally been ordered as the last episodes of the seventh season) and the episodes from "Two Swords" through the Islands miniseries (which had originally been ordered as the beginning of the eighth season) were combined to form the series' eighth season. "Orb" through "Three Buckets" (which had originally been ordered as the end of season eight) were then considered by the network to constitute the series' ninth season.

The season's episodes were produced similarly to previous seasons. They began as simple two-to-three-page outlines with necessary plot information. These outlines were then given to storyboard artists, who expanded the rough outline into a full storyboard. The episodes' design and coloring were done at Cartoon Network Studios in Burbank, California, and Rough Draft Korea or Saerom Animation created the animation in South Korea. Continuing a tradition which began with the fifth-season episode "A Glitch Is a Glitch", this season also featured guest animators. "Ketchups animation is by Alex and Lindsay Small-Butera, a husband-and-wife team known for their web series Baman Piderman. The Small-Buteras had previously contributed animation to the eighth-season episode, "Beyond the Grotto".

The season's main storyline writers included Jack Pendarvis, Adam Muto, Ashly Burch, Osborne, and Julia Pott. According to Pendarvis, after Burch left following the eighth season "Julia parachuted in at perhaps the most mind-boggling moment in the sweeping arc of the series just totally undaunted, and showed incredible spirit and ingeniousness that encouraged us to press forward." Storyboard artists who worked on this season included Adam Muto, Sam Alden, Polly Guo, Seo Kim, Somvilay Xayaphone, Laura Knetzger, Steve Wolfhard, Tom Herpich, Graham Falk, Kent Osborne, Hanna K. Nyström, and Aleks Sennwald. Ghostshrimp, the series' former lead background designer, returned to work on background pieces for "Abstract", "Fionna and Cake and Fionna", and "Whispers". Ghostshrimp left the show after the fourth season, but returned to draw backgrounds for the seventh-season miniseries Stakes.

Miniseries

A miniseries, Elements, aired during late April 2017 as part of season nine. It was first announced on March 31, 2017, by Cartoon Network during the unveiling of their 2017–18 program lineup. Elements follows Finn, Jake, and BMO after they return home to discover that elemental magic has turned Ooo into a dystopia. Finn and Jake join the Ice King (voiced by Tom Kenny), Betty (voiced by Felicia Day), and Lumpy Space Princess (voiced by Pendleton Ward) to set things straight.

Cast

The season's voice actors included Jeremy Shada (Finn the Human), John DiMaggio (Jake the Dog), Tom Kenny (the Ice King), Hynden Walch (Princess Bubblegum), and Olivia Olson (Marceline the Vampire Queen). Ward voiced several minor characters, including Lumpy Space Princess. Former storyboard artist Niki Yang voiced the sentient video-game console BMO in English and Jake's girlfriend, Lady Rainicorn, in Korean. Polly Lou Livingston, a friend of Pendleton Ward's mother, Bettie Ward, voiced the small elephant Tree Trunks. Jessica DiCicco voiced Flame Princess, Finn's ex-girlfriend and ruler of the Fire Kingdom. Andy Milonakis voices N.E.P.T.R., a sentient robot who makes (and throws) pies. The Lich, Adventure Time principal antagonist, was voiced by Ron Perlman in his demonic form and Ethan Maher in his Sweet P form. The cast records their lines together (rather than separately) for more natural-sounding dialogue. Hynden Walch described the group sessions as akin to "doing a play reading—a really, really out-there play."

In addition to the regular cast members, episodes have guest voices by individuals from a range of professions, including actors, musicians, and artists. Tom Scharpling reprised his role as Jake's brother, Jermaine, and Thu Tran returned as AMO in "Orb". Felicia Day voiced the Ice King's fiancée, Betty Grof, in the Elements miniseries; in previous episodes, Betty was played by Lena Dunham). Hayden Ezzy voiced Fern, Ethan Maher voiced Sweet P, Ron Lynch returned as Mr. Pig, Lauren Lapkus reprised her role as Patience St. Pim, Dana Snyder voiced the Life-Giving Magus, Cameron Esposito appears as Carroll the cloud woman, storyboard artist Tom Herpich voices Mr. Fox, Jeff Bennett voiced Choose Goose, John Hodgman reprised his role as Elder Plops, Andy Samberg returned to voice Party Pat, and Andrew Daly voiced Wyatt in the miniseries. Andy Merrill reprised his role as James, and Scharpling returned in "Abstract". In "Ketchup", J. G. Quintel voices an unnamed blue bird. "Fionna and Cake and Fionna" saw the return of Madeleine Martin as Fionna and Roz Ryan as Cake. Chelsea Peretti voiced the Queen of Ooo and Charlotte Newhouse voiced a fake Fionna. In "Three Buckets", Fred Melamed voices Uncle Gumbald.  Other characters were voiced by Dee Bradley Baker, Maria Bamford, Steve Little, and Melissa Villaseñor.

Broadcast and reception

Broadcast

Much like the sixth, seventh, and eighth seasons, the ninth season of Adventure Time had several episode "bombs" in which a number of episodes premiered in a relatively-short time. The first string of new episodes (including Elements) aired between January 30 and February 2, 2017. The second began on July 17, 2017, with "Abstract", and concluded on July 21 with "Three Buckets".

Ratings

The ninth season premiered on television on April 21, 2017, with "Orb", although the episode had been released on the Cartoon Network phone app a week earlier. Seen by 0.71 million viewers, it had a 0.19 Nielsen rating in the 18- to 49-year-old demographic (Nielsen ratings are audience measurement systems for audience size and composition of television programming in the United States; the episode was seen by 0.19 percent of all households aged 18 to 49). This was a decrease from "Islands Part 8: The Light Cloud" (the season-eight finale, seen by one million viewers) and the previous season's premiere, "Broke His Crown" (seen by 1.13 million). Elements had a slight uptick in viewers, with each episode watched by just under one million people. However, season 8 was the first season to fail to hit the one-million viewer mark for any episode, which was a dramatic decrease from the often over two-million viewers the show regularly enjoyed up until season 6. The season finale, "Three Buckets", was watched by 0.85 million viewers and had a 0.23 Nielsen rating in the 18- to 49-year-old demographic (making it the series' lowest-rated season finale).

Reviews and accolades

The season was praised by critics. Oliver Sava of The A.V. Club reviewed and graded each episode with a letter grade; the Elements miniseries received a B, and the rest of the season received three Bs and three As.

Elements was particularly praised. According to Sava, the miniseries helped return the viewers to the land of Ooo and re-center and reconfigure the characters' central relationships. Smith said that the miniseries format permitted "a stronger sense of focus ... with every episode giving the sense that the story is building to a larger conclusion". Paste magazine's Zack Blumenfeld praised the miniseries, writing that Elements "is superior to and more cohesive than both Stakes and Islands, simultaneously a return to Adventure Time's surrealist roots and an emotional step forward".

For her work on the episode "Ketchup", Lindsay Small-Butera won an "Outstanding Individual Achievement in Animation" Emmy at the 70th Primetime Creative Arts Emmy Awards, making it the show's sixth win in this category.

Episodes

Home media

Warner Home Video released Elements, a DVD set which includes the miniseries, in Australia on July 3, 2018. A DVD set which includes seasons eight, nine and ten was released on September 4, 2018.

US release

Australian release

On December 19, 2018, the season was released by itself on DVD and Blu-ray in Australia.

Notes

References

Adventure Time seasons
2017 American television seasons